Kalpeshwar is a Hindu temple dedicated to Shiva located at an elevation of  in the picturesque Urgam valley in the Garhwal region of Uttarakhand state in India. The temple's ancient legend linked to the Pandavas, heroes of the epic Mahabharata, is the fifth temple of the Panch Kedar (five temples) of Shiva's five anatomical divine forms; the other four temples in the order of their worship are Kedarnath, Rudranath, Tungnath and Madhyamaheshwar temples; all in the Kedar Khand region of the Garhwal Himalayas. Kalpeshwar is the only Panch Kedar temple accessible throughout the year. At this small stone temple, approached through a cave passage, the matted tress (jata) of Lord Shiva is worshipped. Hence, Lord Shiva is also called as Jatadhar or Jateshwar. Earlier it was approachable only by  trek from the nearest road head of Helang on the Rishikesh-Badrinath road but now the road goes up to Devgram village from where the trek now is just 300 metres. This road is good for bikes or cars with good ground clearance as it is a half-paved road which may get damaged during monsoons. Small cars can be taken except in monsoons.

Legend
Many folk legends related to the Garhwal region, Lord Shiva and the creation of the Panch Kedar temples are narrated.

A folk legend about Panch Kedar relates to the Pandavas, the heroes of the Hindu epic Mahabharata. The Pandavas defeated and slayed their cousins — the Kauravas in the epic Kurukshetra war. They wished to atone for the sins of committing fratricide (gotra hatya) and Brāhmanahatya (killing of Brahmins — the priest class) during the war. Thus, they handed over the reins of their kingdom to their kin and left in search of lord Shiva and to seek his blessings. First, they went to the holy city of Varanasi (Kashi), believed to be Shiva's favourite city and known for its Kashi Vishwanath Temple. But, Shiva wanted to avoid them as he was deeply incensed by the death and dishonesty at the Kurukshetra war and was, therefore, insensitive to Pandavas' prayers. Therefore, he assumed the form of a bull (Nandi) and hid in the Garhwal region.

Not finding Shiva in Varanasi, the Pandavas went to Garhwal Himalayas. Bhima, the second of the five Pandava brothers, then standing astride two mountains started to look for Shiva. He saw a bull grazing near Guptakashi (“hidden Kashi” — the name derived from the hiding act of Shiva). Bhima immediately recognized the bull to be Shiva. Bhima caught hold of the bull by its tail and hind legs. But the bull-formed Shiva disappeared into the ground to later reappear in parts, with the hump raising in Kedarnath, the arms appearing in Tungnath, the face showing up at Rudranath, the nabhi (navel) and stomach surfacing in Madhyamaheshwar and the hair appearing in Kalpeshwar. The Pandavas pleased with this reappearance in five different forms, built temples at the five places for venerating and worshipping Shiva. The Pandavas were thus freed from their sins.

A variant of the tale credits Bhima of not only catching the bull, but also stopping it from disappearing. Consequently, the bull was torn asunder into five parts and appeared at five locations in the Kedar Khand of Garhwal region of the Himalayas. After building the Panch Kedar Temples, the Pandavas meditated at Kedarnath for salvation, performed yagna (fire sacrifice) and then through the heavenly path called the Mahapanth (also called Swargarohini), attained heaven or salvation.. The Panch Kedar Temples are constructed in the North-Indian Himalayan Temple architecture with the Kedarnath, Tungnath and Madhyamaheshwar temples looking similar.

After completing the pilgrimage of Lord Shiva's darshan at the Panch Kedar Temples, it is an unwritten religious rite to visit Lord Vishnu at the Badrinath Temple, as a final affirmatory proof by the devotee that he has sought blessings of Lord Shiva.
Many folk legends related to the Garhwal region, Lord Shiva and the creation of the Panch Kedar temples are narrated.

Worship
The temple priests at this temple also are the Dasnamis and Gossains, disciples of Adi Shankara. At Tungnath also the priests are Khasiya Brahmins. These priests hail from South India; the Namboodiri brahminfrom Kerala sect who worship at Badrinath. at Kedarnath, the Jangamas are lingayats from Mysore in Karnataka. In all these temples the pooja is designed by adi sankara. these priests also are supposed to be  appointed by  Adi Shankara. The priests at the Rudranath temple are Dasnamis and Gosains.

Geography

The Kalpeshwar temple is located in the Urgam valley of the Himalayan mountain range near Urgam village ( short of the temple). On the bridle path from Helang to Kalpeshwar, the confluence of the Alaknanda and Kalpganga rivers is seen. Kalpganga river flows through the Urgam valley. The Urgam valley is a dense forest area. The valley has apple orchards and terraced fields where potato is grown extensively.

Access
But now a good jeep-able road is constructed from Helang to Devgram so from Urgam it's just 300 meters trek to reach Kalpeshwar temple . Only Bolero, Thar or Gurkha are vehicles suitable for the Road. The road is very rough and not suitable to normal cars. Beginner drivers should refrain from driving on this road.
Boodha Kedar temple surrounded by potato fields is seen on the trek route. Also seen is the Dhyan Badri temple at Urgam Village, one of the Sapt Badri (seven Badri) temples.

References

External links
 Locations of Panch Kedar - Schematic sketch
 Panch Kedar, trek map, page 78

Shiva temples in India
Hindu temples in Uttarakhand
Panch Kedar